Sarraf or al-Sarraf is an Arabic and Persian surname. It translates to money changer. It is considered an occupational surname. Notable people with the surname include:

Pawan Sarraf (born 2000), Nepalese cricketer
Yacoub Sarraf (born 1961), Lebanese politician
Youssef Ibrahim Sarraf (1940–2006), Egyptian Chaldean bishop
Zaki al-Sarraf (1932–1996), Iraqi poet and writer